Bunessan is a small village on the Ross of Mull in the south-west of the Isle of Mull, off the west coast of Scotland. The settlement is within the parish of Kilfinichen and Kilvickeon, and is situated on the A849.

Community
In 1961 it had a population of 107. A village hall is used for dances throughout the year. The primary school for the Ross of Mull is found in Bunessan.

Economy
Business has included crofting, a mill (now home to the Ross of Mull Historical Centre), weaving and a small fishing fleet, up to the end of the 20th century. The village still has a lobster fishery.

Bunessan village has one hotel, The Argyll Arms (the only pub in the area), one grocery shop and a craft shop.

Hymn tune
Bunessan lends its name to a hymn tune, originally associated with the Christmas carol "Child in the Manger", then later with hymn "Morning Has Broken".

Lighthouse
Bunessan lighthouse is located on a skerry of  Gray Island in the entrance to Loch na Lathaich and the harbour of Bunessan. The present lighthouse is a metal skeletal tower covered by white aluminium panel as day mark and the light on the top. The light emits a white or red flash, depending on the direction every 6 seconds.

See also
 List of lighthouses in Scotland
 List of Northern Lighthouse Board lighthouses

References

External links
Canmore - Mull, Bunessan, Kilvickeon Church site record
Canmore - Mull, An Caisteal site record
Canmore - Mull, Bunessan site record
Canmore - Mull, Sheepknowe Cottage site record
Canmore - Mull, Bunessan, Mill Brae site record
 Northern Lighthouse Board 
 Closeup of the lighthouse

Villages on the Isle of Mull